Jeffrey I. Zink is an American molecular biologist and chemist currently a Distinguished Professor at University of California, Los Angeles whose interests are in materials, nanoscience, physical and inorganic chemistry. His current research is examining molecules containing metal and nanomaterials. He worked with Fraser Stoddart to help develop machines that could be applied to deliver drugs. According to Google Scholar, his highest citations are 2,451, 2,096, 1,917, 1,865, and 1,132 (H-index = 112; Total citations > 53,900 as of February 6, 2023).

Education
He graduated from University of Wisconsin with his B.S. before then earning his Ph.D. from University of Illinois in 1970.

Selected publications

References

Year of birth missing (living people)
Living people
University of California, Los Angeles faculty
American molecular biologists
University of Wisconsin–Madison alumni
University of Illinois Urbana-Champaign alumni
Place of birth missing (living people)